Illawarra Christian School (ICS) is a co-educational Christian parent-controlled school in Cordeaux Heights, Wollongong, New South Wales, Australia that was established in 1982 and offers Prep (pre-school) to Year 12 education.  It began its Prep program in 2008. The school currently caters for more than 650 students across all years.

History 
In 1982, Illawarra Christian School first opened in the Woonona Presbyterian Church hall with one teacher and 10 students. Three years later in 1985, the board purchased the current site in Cordeaux Heights. In the same year, Alan Kendall was appointed as the first principal of the school. In 1987, the staff and students moved from the church hall into the new site.

In 1988, Geoff Hewitt was appointed the second principal of the school. The student population was now at 263 with classes from Kindergarten to Year 8. The first Year 12 class graduated in 1992. In 1994, Illawarra Christian School amalgamated with Tongarra Christian School (currently Calderwood Christian School) to form one Association with two campuses. 

In 2008, Simon Lainson was appointed the third principal of the school.  The school currently employs 62 teaching staff.

Governance 
Illawarra Christian School is governed by Illawarra Christian Education.

Associated Schools 
Illawarra Christian School currently has a sister school operated by Illawarra Christian Education:

 Calderwood Christian School, Albion Park

See also 

 List of non-government schools in New South Wales
 List of schools in Illawarra and the South East (New South Wales)
 Education in Australia

References

External links 
 

Private primary schools in New South Wales
Private secondary schools in New South Wales
Schools in Wollongong
Educational institutions established in 1982
1982 establishments in Australia
Nondenominational Christian schools in New South Wales